Prosa can refer to:

 Prosa, Norwegian literary magazine
 PROSA, Danish trade union
 Albert Prosa (b. 1990), Estonian football player
 Perosa Canavese, Turin province, Italy (Piedmontese name)
 In Medieval music, one type of trope

See also

Prose